Vasilios Metaxoulis (born 16 June 1995) is a Greek footballer  who currently plays for AO Thiva.

Career
Metaxoulis began his career with the youth club of Panetolikos F.C.  He signed his first professional contract with Panetolikos in February 2010, at the age of 14. He made his first-team debut on 11 November 2012, playing against Anagennisi Epanomi F.C. for the 2012–2013 Greek Football League.  On 16 January 2014 he signed a six-month contract on loan with A.E.Messolonghi F.C.

In August 2014, Metaxoulis signed a three-year contract with Niki Volos F.C.
In January 2016, Metaxoulis signed with Aiolos Karpenusiou.

Metaxoulis has been capped with the Greek U-17 squad.

References

External links
Profile  at Panetolikos.gr

1995 births
Living people
Greek footballers
Panetolikos F.C. players
Association football forwards
Footballers from Western Greece
People from Aetolia-Acarnania